Veyrines may refer to:

Veyrines-de-Vergt, a commune in the Dordogne
Veyrines-de-Domme, a commune in the Dordogne
Tour de Veyrines in Mérignac, Gironde
Église Sainte-Marie de Veyrines, a church in Saint-Symphorien-de-Mahun